Acacia malloclada is a shrub belonging to the genus Acacia and the subgenus Juliflorae that is native to northern  Australia.

The shrub has a slender habit and has hairy and angular branchlets. Like most species of Acacia it has phyllodes rather than true leaves. It has stiff, linear, flat, straight to slightly curved evergreen phyllodes. The phyllodes are sparsely hairy and have six to ten parallel, longitudinal veins that are equally prominent.

See also
List of Acacia species

References

malloclada
Taxa named by William Blakely
Taxa named by Joseph Maiden
Plants described in 1928